Blything Rural District was a rural district within the administrative county of East Suffolk between 1894 and 1934.

Evolution
The district had its origins in the Blything Hundred Incorporation, set up in 1764 to administer the poor laws in the hundred of Blything. A workhouse to serve the area was built at Bulcamp in the parish of Blythburgh, opening in 1766. Following the Poor Law Amendment Act 1834, the old incorporation was dissolved and replaced by the Blything Poor Law Union in 1835. In 1872, sanitary districts were established, with responsibility for public health and local government given to the boards of guardians of poor law unions for areas without urban authorities. The Blything Rural Sanitary District therefore covered the area of the Blything Poor Law Union except for the parish of Southwold, which was a municipal borough and so formed its own urban sanitary district.

Under the Local Government Act 1894, rural sanitary districts became rural districts on 28 December 1894. Blything Rural District Council held its first meeting on 31 December 1894 at the Blything Union Workhouse at Bulcamp, Blythburgh. Thomas Lomax of Grove Park, Yoxford, was appointed the first chairman of the council; he had previously been chairman of the Blything Board of Guardians. The council continued to be based at the workhouse at Bulcamp throughout its existence.

Two urban districts were subsequently created out of parishes within Blything: Leiston cum Sizewell in 1895 and Halesworth in 1900.

In 1934, under a County Review Order, Blything Rural District was abolished. The largest part of its territory passed to the new but similarly named Blyth Rural District; apart from small adjustments the rest went to Lothingland and Wainford Rural Districts.

Statistics

Parishes

References

History of Suffolk
Districts of England created by the Local Government Act 1894
Rural districts of England